Census taker may refer to:
Someone who collects census data by visiting individual homes
The Census Taker, a 1984 movie
Census Taker, the soundtrack to the 1984 movie